Espoonlahti (Finnish) or Esboviken (Swedish) is an underground station on the western metro extension (Länsimetro) of the Helsinki Metro in Finland. The station is opened on 3 December 2022, is located on the southwestern side of the shopping center Lippulaiva, near Espoonlahti, between Espoonlahti and Solmutori, 1 kilometer east from Kivenlahti metro station and 1.3 kilometers northwest from Soukka metro station.

References

External links
Länsimetro work in progress

 

Helsinki Metro stations
2022 establishments in Finland